Aragó is a family name that descended from the kings of the Aragonese Crown. The kings never used any family name. All lines are now exhausted. The name originated from the rivers Aragón and Aragón Subordán in northern Spain.

Lines

Originated by four sons of James I of Aragon
Majorca, created by the king James II of Majorca.
Hixar, created by Peter, lord of Hixar.
Xerica, created by Peter, lord of Xerica.
Castre, created by Ferran lord of Castre.

Originated by a son of James II of Aragon
Empúries, created by Ramón Berenguer I, count of Empúries
Prades-Gandia-Villena, created by Peter I, Count of Prades (later dukes)

Originated by a son of Alfonso III of Aragon 
Urgell, created by James I count of Urgell

Originated by a son of Peter II of Aragon 
Avola, created by Frederic II king of Sicily, they were lords (later Marquiss) of Avola and Terranova.

Originated by a son of Ferran I of Aragon 
Segorbe, created by Henry I lord of Segorbe (Later dukes)

Originated by a son of Alfonso IV of Aragon 
Naples, created by Ferdinand I king of Naples

Originated by a son of Ferdinand I of Naples 
Montalto, created by Ferdinand, duke of Montalto

Originated by a son of John II of Aragon 
Vilafermosa, created by Alphonse, duke of Vilafermosa

Originated by a son of Ferran II of Aragon 
Argavieso-Ballobar, created by Alfonso (archbishop of Zaragoza) and their descendants

References

Aragon